The Transfiguration of Our Lord Chapel is a historic Russian Orthodox church in Nushagak, Alaska. This now-abandoned building was erected in 1904 and was the third Russian Orthodox church to be built on this site, following earlier ones dating to the 1820s and 1860. Although this church has obvious Russian Orthodox features (most notably the onion dome atop the tower), it would not otherwise look out of place in a traditional New England village.

The church was listed on the National Register of Historic Places in 1980.

See also
National Register of Historic Places listings in Dillingham Census Area, Alaska

References

Churches on the National Register of Historic Places in Alaska
Buildings and structures completed in 1904
Buildings and structures on the National Register of Historic Places in Dillingham Census Area, Alaska